Sharlene Marie Zeta Robinson (born 8 March 1981), known professionally as Charli Robinson previously as Charli Delaney, is an Australian television and radio presenter, most famously known as an original member of children's musical group Hi-5 and the television series of the same name. She left Hi-5 in February 2008 after ten years with the group. She is known now as a presenter on Nine Network travel program Getaway.

Biography

Early life
Robinson was born in Newcastle, New South Wales, and she has an older sister named Casandra. She attended Hunter School of the Performing Arts at Broadmeadow, Newcastle, before featuring in various TV shows and soap operas.

Hi-5
Robinson was the youngest original member of group Hi-5.

Robinson chose to leave Hi-5 in February 2008, officially announcing on 22 February 2008 that she would be leaving the group. She indicated that she would continue with the show until a suitable replacement was found. Robinson noted her plans for the future include other presenting work and acting in television and films, to challenge herself. She served as a judge on Battle of the Choirs in 2008, and she also appeared on the eighth season of Dancing with the Stars.

TV Hosting
In 2009, Robinson co-hosted the celebrity singing show It Takes Two with Home and Away actor Paul O'Brien and signed a three-year contract with the show. She also appeared in the short film Tegan the Vegan

Radio presenter
In 2009, Robinson had a show on the Today Network's 2DayFM and Fox FM on late nights initially [Monday to Wednesday] with Chris Page and had co-hosted the Top 6 @ 6 with Danno on the Today Network for one hour.

In May 2011, Robinson filled in as the host on The Kyle & Jackie O Show while Kyle Sandilands and Jackie Henderson were off on sick leave.

Television and radio miscellaneous
In October 2011, it was announced that she would be hosting a re-launch of the TV show It's a Knockout.

On 5 December 2011, it was announced that Charli was signed to host the Sea FM Gold Coast breakfast show in 2012 with Simon "Baggs" Baggott and Paul "Galey" Gale.

Personal life
Robinson married her childhood partner, Brent Delaney, in 2003. The pair separated in 2009 after six years together.

In February 2016, Robinson revealed that she and her partner of five years, Justin Kirkpatrick, had separated.

In August 2018, Robinson and partner Liam Talbot announced they were expecting their first child.

On 27 December 2018, Robinson and Talbot welcomed a baby girl, Kensington Claire Talbot.

On 13 October 2019, Robinson and her partner, Liam Talbot, became engaged at Mount Panorama.

On 20 July 2020, Robinson and Talbot welcomed their second child, another baby girl, Theadora Elle Talbot.

Filmography

Dancing with the Stars performances
In late 2008, Robinson competed in the eighth season of Dancing with the Stars. Robinson's partner was Csaba Szirmai, one of the show's resident professional dancers.

References

External links

Charli Robinson at ninemsn

1981 births
Living people
Australian television presenters
Australian children's musicians
Australian radio presenters
Actresses from the Gold Coast, Queensland
Musicians from Gold Coast, Queensland
21st-century Australian singers
21st-century Australian women singers
Australian women radio presenters
Australian women television presenters